The 2010–11 season achieved the highest ever league placing for Accrington Stanley to date when they reached 5th in League Two, beating their previous best of 15th in 2009–10. This took them through to the League Two Play Offs for the first time, where they lost to Stevenage 3–0 on aggregate in the semi final.

Current squad

First Team squad
Updated 6 May 2011.

Fixtures and results

Pre-season

JOMA South West Challenge Cup

The South West Challenge Cup is a pre-season friendly tournament in North Devon. Rules are different from main first team football in that n the group stage matches, each half lasts 40 minutes, before reverting to the standard 45 minutes for the knockout stages. The tournament features an unconventional points system through the group stages, which the tournament organisers state is "designed to encourage attacking football".

 Each winning side gets the standard three points for a win.
 Losing teams receive one point if they lose without scoring, and two if they lose but score.
 There are no draws; if teams are all square at full-time the game goes straight to a penalty shootout to determine the winner.

Group 1

League Two

Play Offs

FA Cup

Stanley went out of this year's FA Cup at Round 2 to fellow League Two side Port Vale. In Round 1, Stanley knocked out League One side Oldham Athletic in a giantkilling Manchester derby.

Carling Cup

Stanley equalled their best ever performance in the League Cup by reaching round 2, a feat they previously achieved in 2006–07 & the previous season. They got that far by beating Championship side Doncaster Rovers away from home and after extra time. In Round 2 they played Premier League side Newcastle United competitively for the first time. The tie was also covered live by Sky Sports.

Football League Trophy

Strangely Stanley were knocked out of the Football League Trophy without losing a match. After beating League One side Tranmere Rovers on penalties, Stanley were charged by The FA of fielding Ray Putterill who was unaware to Stanley, under a suspension from the previous season whilst playing for Halewood Town. With impending talks due and further rounds continuing, Stanley decided to withdraw from the competition with Tranmere taking their place.

League data

League table

Results summary

Results by round

Statistics

Appearances, goals and cards
Updated 20 May 2011.
(Substitute appearances in brackets)

Transfers

References

Accrington Stanley F.C. seasons
Accrington Stanley